Mutch is a surname. Notable people with the surname include:

Alec Mutch (1889–1960), Australian rules footballer
Andy Mutch (born 1963), English former football player
Charlie Mutch (1893–1974), former Australian rules footballer
Duane Mutch (1925–2019), American politician, member of the North Dakota State Senate
Fred Mutch (1898–1986), former Australian rules footballer
George Mutch (1912–2001), Scottish football player
Jordon Mutch (born 1991), English professional footballer
Leslie Mutch (1897–1977), Liberal party member of the Canadian House of Commons
Maria Mutch, Canadian writer
Robert Mutch (born 1984), South African cricketer
Sandy Mutch (1884–1967), Scottish football goalkeeper
Sarah Mutch, Canadian fashion model
Stephen Mutch, Ph.D., LL.B. (born 1956), Australian politician
Thomas A. Mutch (1931–1980), American geologist and planetary scientist
Thomas Mutch (1885–1958), Australian politician
Tom Mutch, former American ice hockey coach

See also
Much (disambiguation)
Mutchkin
Mutschel